Mason City is a city in Mason County, Illinois, United States. The population was 2,077 at the 2020 census, down from 2,343 in 2010.

History
Mason City was established in 1857. The city took its name from Mason County.

Geography
Mason City is located in eastern Mason County at  (40.202965, -89.696109). Illinois Route 10 passes through the city as Chestnut Street, leading east  to Lincoln and west  to Easton. Illinois Route 29 touches the western edge of the city, leading north  to Pekin and south  to Springfield, the state capital.

The village drains to the south toward Salt Creek, a west-flowing tributary of the Sangamon River and part of the Illinois River watershed.

Demographics

At the 2000 census, there were 2,558 people, 1,041 households and 681 families residing in the city. The racial makeup of the city was 99.06% White, 0.04% African American, 0.08% Native American, 0.16% Asian, 0.27% from other races, and 0.39% from two or more races. Hispanic or Latino of any race were 0.59% of the population.

There were 1,041 households, of which 30.4% had children under the age of 18 living with them, 51.3% were married couples living together, 11.2% had a female householder with no husband present, and 34.5% were non-families. 31.5% of all households were made up of individuals, and 18.3% had someone living alone who was 65 years of age or older. The average household size was 2.38 and the average family size was 2.95.

Age distribution was 25.2% under the age of 18, 7.0% from 18 to 24, 25.3% from 25 to 44, 20.7% from 45 to 64, and 21.9% who were 65 years of age or older. The median age was 40 years. For every 100 females, there were 87.1 males. For every 100 females age 18 and over, there were 81.7 males.

The median household income was $35,615, and the median family income was $47,991. Males had a median income of $35,058 versus $21,875 for females. The per capita income for the city was $18,411. About 6.8% of families and 9.3% of the population were below the poverty line, including 13.6% of those under age 18 and 8.0% of those age 65 or over.

Notable people

 Gordon Buehrig, automobile designer, born in Mason City
 John Fahay, professional football player, born in Mason City
 John Means (AKA: "Dr. Gonzo"), stand-up comic, toured with Huey Lewis and the News, born in Mason City
 Clyde E. Stone, Chief Justice of the Illinois Supreme Court, born near Mason City
 Joe Sullivan, pitcher for the Detroit Tigers, Boston Braves, Boston Red Sox and Pittsburgh Pirates; born in Mason City
 Hallie Paxson Winsborough, Presbyterian church leader, anti-lynching activist, born in Mason City
 Vic Wunderle, archer, winner of the Olympic Individual Silver Medal (2000)

Culture 
 The song "Mason City" from The Fiery Furnaces' album Blueberry Boat references the city.

References

Cities in Illinois
Cities in Mason County, Illinois
Populated places established in 1857
1857 establishments in Illinois